William Paton (died 2002) was a Scottish footballer who played for Bo'ness United, Motherwell and Yeovil Town. He should not be confused with his namesake Willie Paton, a striker who played for Rangers around the same time.

He made eleven appearances for Motherwell between 1947 and 1950, scoring one goal.

References

Scottish footballers
2002 deaths
Yeovil Town F.C. players
Motherwell F.C. players
Bo'ness United F.C. players
Scottish Football League players
Year of birth missing
Association football midfielders